Dênis Oliveira de Souza (born September 21, 1983 in Ipatinga), known as just Dênis, is a retired Brazilian right back. 

Dênis was discovered by Santos when his team Ipatinga eliminated them from Brazil Cup on penalty shootout, in 2006. Denis was signed right after this elimination game.

He conquered the right-back spot and played well in 2006 until a knee injury knocked him out of the season. When he recovered, already in 2007, his spot was covered by new signing Pedro. 

When he finally displaced Pedro (who ended up being released and joined Sporting), he injured himself again against Caracas FC. He is expected to return in 2008.

Honours
São Paulo State League: 2007

Contract
19 May 2008 to 31 December 2008

External links
 santos.globo.com
 CBF
 sambafoot

1983 births
Living people
Brazilian footballers
Associação Atlética Ponte Preta players
União Agrícola Barbarense Futebol Clube players
Ipatinga Futebol Clube players
Santos FC players
Sport Club Corinthians Paulista players

Association football defenders